Jean Michel Prosper Guérin (1838 – 28 September 1917) was a 19th-century French painter.  He studied in the Académie des Beaux-Arts where he was a pupil of painters like Flandrin.  His son, Charles-François-Prosper Guérin (1875–1939) was also a painter.

Works
These three pictures are property of French government:

External links
  Site web de la Classe Patrimoine
  Page du ministère de la culture avec un des tableaux de Prosper.G
  Page du ministère de la culture avec La Pieta
  Page du ministère de la culture avec L'agar

1838 births
19th-century French painters
French male painters
20th-century French painters
20th-century French male artists
1917 deaths
19th-century French male artists